The Panama ghost catshark (Apristurus stenseni) is a lesser known catshark of the family Scyliorhinidae. This catshark is only found off Panama, between 9°N and 2°N. The reproduction of the Panama ghost shark is oviparous.

Etymology
The catshark is named in honor of Danish geologist and anatomist Niels Stensen (1638-1686), also known as Nicolas Steno.

References 

 

Panama ghost catshark
Fish of Panama
Taxa named by Stewart Springer 
Panama ghost catshark